RHS Garden Harlow Carr is one of five public gardens run by the Royal Horticultural Society. It is located on the western edge of Harrogate in the English county of North Yorkshire.

The RHS acquired Harlow Carr through its merger with the Northern Horticultural Society in 2001. It had been the Northern Horticultural Society's trial ground and display garden since they bought it in 1946.

Location
The garden is situated on Crag Lane, off Otley Road (B6162) about a mile and a half from the centre of Harrogate.

Features

Harlow Carr has:
 Winter Walk 
 Kitchen Garden 
 Gardens through Time 
 The Queen Mother’s Lake 
 Woodland 
 Streamside 
 Wildflower meadow and bird hide 
 Arboretum 
 Humus-rich terraces 
 Winter Garden 
 Scented Garden 
 Foliage Garden 
 Annual and perennial displays 
 Ornamental Grasses border 
 Alpine House 
 Learning Centre
Library

It also has a shop, plant centre and Bettys Cafe Tea Rooms.

History

Springs of sulphur water were discovered on the site in the 18th century but development of the site as a spa did not take place for over a hundred years. In 1840, the owner of the estate, Henry Wright, cleaned out and protected one of the wells and four years later built a hotel and a bath house. People were charged two shillings and six pence (nominally 12 p but about £ at current prices) to bathe in the warm waters. The gardens were laid out around the bath house and in 1861 the site at Harlow Carr springs was described as:

The hotel later became the Harrogate Arms but closed in 2013.

The Northern Horticultural Society was founded in 1946 with the objective of:

The society leased  of mixed woodland, pasture and arable land at Harlow Hill from the Harrogate Corporation and it opened the Harlow Carr Botanical Gardens in 1950. The chief aim of the venture was to set up a trial ground where the suitability of plants for growing in northern climates could be assessed.

The bath house was converted in 1958 to contain the library and study centre. More recently it has been used as an exhibition space for arts and crafts. The six well heads in front of the bath house have been capped off but remain beneath the present Limestone Rock Garden. At times there is a smell of sulphur in this area.

A new learning centre was built in 2010 containing classrooms for school visits and adult learning courses, and the library. The latter holds a range of gardening-related books, periodicals and DVDs which can be loaned to RHS members and accessed by any garden visitor.

In 2014 the Harrogate Arms and the land surrounding it was acquired by the RHS with plans progressing to restore the building, create new gardens around it and reintroduce its links with the old bath house.

In 2021 the new Thaliana Bridge was installed across the Queen Mother's Lake with the design representing the sequence of an Arabidopsis thaliana chromosome. This was inspired by the work of the botanical scientist Rachel Leech.

Geoffrey Smith, writer and broadcaster, was Superintendent of Harlow Carr from 1954 to 1974.

References

External links

 Official website

Harlow Carr
Botanical gardens in Yorkshire
Gardens in North Yorkshire
Tourist attractions in Harrogate